Andrew Rodney Impey (born 30 September 1971) is an English football coach and former professional footballer who is an academy coach at Queens Park Rangers.

As a player, he was a full-back or winger who notably played in the Premier League for Queens Park Rangers, West Ham United and Leicester City. He also played in the Football League for Nottingham Forest, Millwall and Coventry City. He was capped once at England U21 level.

Since 2015, he was worked back at Queens Park Rangers and has worked as an academy coach, currently with the clubs under-23 setup.

Club career
Impey signed for Queens Park Rangers in 1990 and made his debut against Norwich in October 1991. For six years he played either in defence or on the wing, alongside players such as Les Ferdinand and Trevor Sinclair. He won QPR's player of the season award in 1993, 1994 and 1995, becoming the first player ever to win a club player of the season award for three consecutive seasons.

In 1997, he moved to West Ham United for £1.2m.

Impey transferred to Leicester City in the middle of the 1998–99 season; Hammers manager Harry Redknapp was notably aggrieved at this transfer as Impey had been sold by the West Ham board without his consent. While at Leicester, Impey was part of their 2000 League Cup winning team, coming on as a substitute in the final.

Impey joined Nottingham Forest on loan in February 2004, where he scored the opening goal of the game on his debut against Walsall to end Forest's goal drought. He then made the move permanent in the summer. Impey became a cult hero to Forest fans after, whilst warming up on the touchline, they began chanting "Andy Impey's got no neck! He's just a head on some shoulders!" Impey subsequently turned round and revealed his neck to the fans, starting an onslaught of songs about the neckless wonder.

In September 2005 Impey joined Coventry City on non-contract terms, leaving the club in 2006 and subsequently retiring.

International career
Impey played for the England U21s once in 1992. He was also called up to Terry Venables' get-together England squad in April 1995, but ultimately was never capped for the senior side.

Coaching career
In 2015, he re-joined QPR as an Academy Coach and is currently the Under 23's assistant coach.

Honours
Leicester City
League Cup: 1999–00

References

External links

Profile and stats at FoxesTalk
England profile at TheFA

1971 births
Living people
Footballers from Hammersmith
English footballers
Association football defenders
Coventry City F.C. players
Millwall F.C. players
Nottingham Forest F.C. players
Leicester City F.C. players
West Ham United F.C. players
Queens Park Rangers F.C. players
Yeading F.C. players
Premier League players
England under-21 international footballers
Queens Park Rangers F.C. non-playing staff